Mikhail Piskunov (21 December 1967 – 10 September 2002) was a professional rugby league footballer who played his whole club career for Paris Saint-Germain of the European Super League. He also represented France and Russia at international level.

In 2002, Piskunov died in a car accident at the age of 34.

Club 
 198?-1993 : Tiraspol
 1993-1998 : Villefranche XIII Aveyron
 1996 : Paris Saint-Germain Rugby League
 1998-1999 : Stade Aurillacois Cantal Auvergne
 1999-2000 : Stade Rodez Aveyron
 2000-2002 : Sporting Club decazevillois

Playing career 
In 1996, Piskunov made his professional debut for PSG in Round 1 against the Sheffield Eagles. This was PSG's inaugural game in club history, winning 30-24. Mikhail Piskunov scored once that game.

Despite starting his club career in 1996, Piskunov was a national representative for the Russian national team (then known as the Commonwealth of Independent States). He played 2 games for the team at the centre position in 1992, both against South Africa. Piskunov's team won 30-26 and 22-19.

He represented France in 1997 in a game against South Africa. Playing wing, his side won 30-17.

References 

1967 births
2002 deaths
Expatriate rugby league players in France
Moldova national rugby league team players
Villefranche XIII Aveyron players
Paris Saint-Germain Rugby League players
Road incident deaths in France
France national rugby league team players